SSAM may refer to:

 Ssam, meaning "wrapped", refers to a dish in Korean cuisine
 St. Scholastica's Academy of Marikina